Scott Armstrong may refer to:

J. Scott Armstrong (born 1937), Wharton Business School professor
Scott Armstrong (basketball) (1913–1997), American professional basketball player
Scott Armstrong (journalist), former Washington Post journalist and author
Scott Armstrong (politician) (born 1966), Canadian Member of Parliament
Scott Armstrong (rugby union) (born 1986), rugby union player for Northampton Saints
Scott Armstrong (wrestler) (born 1959), professional wrestler and referee
Scott A. Armstrong, American oncologist
Scott Armstrong, president and CEO of Group Health Cooperative

See also
Scot Armstrong, American screenwriter and producer